Hajra Khan (born 29 December 1993) is a Pakistani footballer who is the captain of the Pakistan women's national football team. She plays as a striker or midfielder. She became part of Pakistan national team in 2009 which she led as a captain from 2014.

Early and personal life
Hajra Khan was born on December 29, 1993, in Karachi, Pakistan. From an early age, Khan's dream was to become a professional athlete but not a footballer. She was discovered by Diya W.F.C. coach Sadia Sheikh, when she was looking for provincial team. Khan debuted aged 14 and scored nine goals in three games for Diya W.F.C., which won her the Top Scorer of the tournament award.

Club career 
Starting with Diya W.F.C., she won the Misha Dawood Trophy during the 2010 National Women Football Championship. 

In January 2014, she decided to leave Diya and join Balochistan United. Khan won the Pakistani women's football championship with Balochistan United in 2014, scoring the only goal against former club Diya in the final. She then accepted an offer to play for Maldivian club Sun Hotels and Resorts FC in the FAM Women's Football Championship.

In summer 2015, Khan spent a month in Germany and attended pre-season trials with four clubs. She was unable to accept a transfer offer from MSV Duisburg due to visa issues. She became the only Pakistani player to score 100 goals in her club career. She joined Sun Hotels and Resorts Maldives club on 24 May 2015. Hajra currently plays for Pakistan Army.

International career 
In 2009, Khan was selected in the Pakistan national team for the 2010 South Asian Games in Dhaka, Bangladesh. After Khan's participation at this event, the Pakistan Football Federation (PFF) selected her for a FIFA women's football coaching course in  Colombo, Sri Lanka. In December 2010, she played in the inaugural SAFF Women's Championship, helping Pakistan reach the semi-final.

She was the first Pakistani women footballer to sign an international contract in 2014 with Sun Hotels & Resorts Football Club to play in the Maldives National Women's league.

International Statistics

As an Athlete

Netball 
At the 2011 South Asian Beach Games in Hambantota, Sri Lanka, the talented young athlete even helped the Pakistan National Netball Team bring home a bronze medal.

Honours
 National Women Football Championship: 2014

References

External links 
 Profile at Pakistan Football Federation (PFF)

Pakistani women's footballers
Pakistan women's international footballers
Living people
1994 births
Footballers from Karachi
Diya W.F.C. players
Balochistan United W.F.C. players
Pakistani expatriate sportspeople in the Maldives
Women's association football midfielders
Women's association football forwards
FSV Gütersloh 2009 players